The People's Republic of Animation (PRA) is an animation studio based in Adelaide, Australia. It began as a creator of music videos for Australian bands in 2003, and has since created award-winning short films and TV commercials, and developed feature films.

Foundation
As 14-year-olds, in 1996, PRA founders Eddie White, James Calvert & Hugh Nguyen began experimenting with a Super 8 film camera under the name of ‘Dabble Animation’. Their first short film Natural Born Animators (1998) was made two years later and achieved some national and international festival success on the student film circuit, including a selection at the Student Animation Festival in Ottawa, Ontario, Canada. In 2000 White renamed the team 'The People's Republic of Animation', a name coined after he flipped through an old Funk & Wagnall's encyclopedia looking for titles and saw the heading 'The People's Republic of China' and liked the empire-like and grand connotations it had. Animator and sculptor Brodie McCrossin joined in 2000, and producer Sam White in 2002, and the company was officially formed in 2003. The company received their first government grant for a stop motion TV pilot and computer animation for a music video in the same year.

Works
The PRA has produced two Australian Film Institute (AFI) winning short films: Fritz gets Rich (2005)  and Carnivore Reflux (2006). Carnivore Reflux was also voted best animated film by Australian audiences at the Inside Film Awards in 2006. Other notable productions include the international short film co-production with the Shanghai Animation Film Studio of China, Sweet & Sour.

White and Calvert directed the first of the Mitsubishi Lancer/Sony Tropfest 'supershort' films titled Safer in a wild world, a one-minute short that blends 2D animation and 3D animation in a pop-up storybook style. White and Ari Gibson of the PRA directed the short film The Cat Piano, with narration by Australian artist Nick Cave.

The PRA subsequently made two short films, I Was A Teenage Butterfly and The Ghastly Gourmet Cooking Show".

Collaborators
Benjamin Speed - Composer / Musical Direction
 Deane Taylor - Art Director
 Greg Holfeld - 2D Animation Director
 Barry Plews and Hu He - Reckless Moments - Co-production partner
Shanghai Animation Film Studio - Co-production partner
 Jessica Brentnall - Magic Films - Producer

Filmography
Short films
 2009 - The Cat Piano - 8:00 - Directed by Eddie White & Ari Gibson, Narrated by Nick Cave, Poem written by Eddie White
 2007 - Sweet & Sour - Co-production with Shanghai Animation Film Studio and Reckless Moments – 17:00 - Written &   Directed by Eddie White
 2006 - Carnivore Reflux – 7:00 - Directed by Eddie White & James Calvert, written by Eddie White
 2005 - Fritz Gets Rich –  12:05 - Directed by Eddie White & James Calvert, written by Eddie White

TV specials and interstitials
 2008 - I Was a Teenage Butterfly 'Battle of the Bug Bands' - Directed by Eddie White & Ari Gibson, written by Eddie White
 2008 - The Ghastly Gourmet Cooking Show 'Meat, Meat, Meat' - Directed by James Calvert & Eddie White, written by Eddie White
 2006 - Dust Echoes "Whirlpool" - Directed by James Calvert
 2006 - Dust Echoes "Mermaid Story" - Directed by James Calvert
 2006 - Errorism: A Comedy of Terrors - Directed by Eddie White

Music videos
 2006 - Hilltop Hoods - Clown Prince
 2003 - The Fuzz - The Bomb (a.k.a. "Sixxx Legs")
 2003 - Trentwood - Operation Never Fall Apart

Awards and honorsThe Cat Piano Winner IF (Inside Film) Award for Best Animation 2009
Yoram Gross Award for best short animation - Dendy Awards - Sydney Film Festival 2009
 Winner Best Animation Short - Melbourne International Film Festival 2009
 Winner Best Animation - IF (Inside Film Awards) 2009
 Audience choice award for Best Short Film - 2009 Adelaide Film Festival
 Official Selection - Short Film Competition -  Annecy International Festival of Animated films 2009
 AFI (Australian Film Institute) Awards - Nominated for Best Short Animation
 Jury Prize for animation & Audience Award for Best Short Film - 15 Short Film Festival 2009Sweet & Sour Golden Monkey award for Best International Co-production - China Cartoon & Animation Festival - 2008
 Yoram Gross Award for best short animation - Dendy Awards - Sydney Film Festival 2007
 SBS Television Award - St. Kilda Film Festival 2007
 Winner - Best Animation - ATOM - Australian Teachers of Media Awards - 2007
 Bronze Shorts Award (3rd prize) - Shorts Film Festival, South Australia, 2008Carnivore Reflux Istanbul Animation Festival 2006 - Jury Prize
 Holland Animation Festival 2006 - Movie Squad Award
 Inside Film Awards Best Short Animation (winner) 2006
 St Kilda Film Festival 2006 - Best Original Score (winner)
 Shorts Film Festival 2006 - Best Under 25 years
 Honourable mention - Zebra Poetry Film Awards, Germany 2006
 Top 16 Finalist - Sony Tropfest, Sydney, 2006Mermaid StoryKalamazoo Animation Festival 2007 (USA) - Jury Award for excellence in visual storytellingFritz Gets Rich Best Film For Children - Bradford Animation Festival, UK 2005The Bomb (Sixxx Legs)''
 Best Visual Effects Award - Belowground Music Video Festival 2004

See also

List of film production companies
List of television production companies

References

External links
PRA on Vimeo
Tropfest - Carnivore Reflux
The People's Republic of Animation on YouTube

Australian animation studios
2003 establishments in Australia
Companies based in Adelaide